Sonic Riders: Zero Gravity is a hoverboard racing video game developed by Sonic Team and published by Sega for the PlayStation 2 and Wii. It is the fifth pure racing game in the Sonic the Hedgehog series, and the second entry in the Sonic Riders trilogy, a spin-off of the main series.

The game received mixed reviews from critics, who praised the graphics, track designs, music and the more simple gameplay mechanics compared to the first Riders game, although some criticized the controls, story and lack of online multiplayer. A sequel, Sonic Free Riders, was released for the Xbox 360 in 2010.

Gameplay

Gameplay in Zero Gravity is largely similar to its predecessor, with characters racing on different types of hovercraft called "Extreme Gear". In addition to the mechanics from the previous game, Zero Gravity adds a new gameplay system based around gravity that replaces the predecessor's "fuel" system. During the race, performing tricks and other actions will increase a character's Gravity Points, or GP. If players have accrued enough GP by the time they enter certain areas of the track, they will enter a Zero-Gravity Zone, where they can perform one of two maneuvers. A Gravity Dive will create a small black hole that points gravity forward down the track, giving the player a powerful free-fall boost that is further augmented by striking objects in the vicinity that the hole displaces, such as cars or signs. Alternatively, Gravity Control will alter the gravity of the course, allowing players to reach otherwise-inaccessible areas and shortcuts. Players can also use Gravity Drift to more easily maneuver around sharp corners.

Building on the upgrade system from Sonic Riders, Zero Gravity features a new system called "Gear Change". Once players gain a certain number of rings during a race, they can choose to activate one of their Gear Parts. Gear Parts are predetermined based on the racer's equipped Extreme Gear, and will grant bonuses when activated, such as increasing a character's top speed or automatically accessing shortcuts that would otherwise require Gravity Control. In addition to the boards, skates, and bikes from the previous game, Zero Gravity also introduces three new types of Extreme Gear: air rides, yachts, and wheels. New Extreme Gear can be unlocked via the in-game shop, with different Gear providing different advantages and unique abilities.

The game includes a total of 16 race tracks, spread across eight areas with two tracks each, which are unlocked via story progression. A total of 18 playable characters can be unlocked, including guest characters from Billy Hatcher and the Giant Egg, Nights into Dreams, and Samba de Amigo.

Zero Gravity once again features two story campaigns, "Heroes" and "Babylon", which intersect with one another to create a single narrative. Three new game modes have also been added: Survival Mode, Survival Relay, and Survival Ball. Survival Mode entails each player to pick up missiles, then lock on and launch them at foes with Gravity Control, the winner being the last person standing. In Survival Relay, teams of two compete in a relay race, using their Extreme Gear as the baton. Survival Ball is a soccer-like minigame, in which players use Gravity Control to launch a ball through hoops.

The Wii version supports two different Wii Remote control schemes, which utilize motion controls to steer and perform Gravity Dives; traditional controls are also available via the use of the Nintendo GameCube controller.

Plot
The Babylon Rogues retrieve an Ark of the Cosmos, one of five relics capable of controlling gravity, intending to use them all to power Babylon Garden's warp engine. Other Arks fall from the sky, with one of them striking technology company MeteoTech's Crimson Tower. As a result, the robots inside go haywire and begin a global rampage. Sonic, who is traveling with Tails and Knuckles, finds one of the Arks. He is attacked by the robots, but uses the Ark's power to escape. While being pursued, the trio runs into Amy, who has also found one of the Arks. The four head to MeteoTech to investigate, where they run into the Rogues, and Storm chases after Amy in an attempt to take her Ark. The others venture further inside, where they discover the company's owner, Doctor Eggman. Eggman reveals that one of the robots, SCR-HD, was struck by the Ark that hit Crimson Tower, giving it sentience and leadership over the other robots. The robots now seek to obtain all five Arks, one of which Eggman used to power the mother computer which controls all of MeteoTech.

Amy surrenders her Ark of the Cosmos to Storm, but the two are attacked by a robot. It suddenly explodes and Storm finds another Ark inside, running off to find Jet. Eggman steals the Rogues' Arks and retreats towards the Crimson Tower, planning to use it to control all the world's robots, with the Rogues in pursuit. Sonic and the others retrieve Amy and travel to Crimson Tower to shut down the mother computer. They meet the Rogues there, and Jet challenges Sonic to one last race, with the winner getting all the Arks. The two storm the tower and take back the Arks, shutting down all the robots. The Arks' resonance calls down the Babylon Garden, and Sonic hands his Arks over to Jet.

Before they can leave, SCR-HD appears and steals the Arks of the Cosmos, retreating to Babylon Garden. SCR-HD activates the Arks, revealing an ancient spaceship inside Babylon Garden, creating a massive black hole capable of destroying the planet and transforming into a monstrous robot named Master Core ABIS. Eggman escapes while the heroes and Rogues head for the ship and defeat ABIS with Gravity Dives, shutting down the Arks and stopping the black hole, leaving the ship adrift in orbit. In the aftermath, Tails speculates that the Babylonians' ancestors were aliens who lost control of their ship, releasing the Arks into orbit to shut it down before crash landing, hoping the Arks would one day return to the surface so they could return to their home planet. Jet arrives and challenges Sonic, who happily accepts.

Reception

Zero Gravity received mixed reviews from critics. It has been praised for its improved graphics, larger level designs, music and easier gameplay concepts, but has also been criticized for its loose controls, lack of online play, story material and removal of certain gameplay elements from its predecessor. Aggregating review websites GameRankings and Metacritic assigned the PlayStation 2 version 59.31% and 56/100 and the Wii version 57.04% and 56/100. GameSpot gave the PS2 version 5.0/10 and the Wii version 4.5/10. IGN rated both the PS2 and the Wii versions a 5.8/10. The Official Nintendo Magazine gave the game a score of 72%, praising its solid multiplayer action and the amount of bonus features but criticized it for its rough controls. GameTrailers praised the game for its graphics, but criticized how the game required the GameCube controller for traditional control, which would be unavailable when played on newer Wii models or the Wii U, as well as how the game could be "almost unplayable" with confusing option selections. Game Informer gave the game an overall score of 6 out of 10 criticizing the Wii motion control making the game needlessly frustrating and even using a GameCube controller the game is nearly mediocre.

Notes

References

External links

 (Flash deprecated)
The Making of Sonic Riders 

Science fiction racing games
2008 video games
Crossover racing games
Multiplayer and single-player video games
Nintendo Wi-Fi Connection games
PlayStation 2 games
Racing video games
Sonic Team games
Split-screen multiplayer games
Video games scored by Fumie Kumatani
Video game sequels
Video games developed in Japan
Video games using Havok
Video games with pre-rendered 3D graphics
Wii Wi-Fi games
Sonic the Hedgehog spin-off games
Video games scored by Kenichi Tokoi
Video games scored by Tomonori Sawada
Video games scored by Hideaki Kobayashi
Video games about birds